Wang Yi-ta  is a Taiwanese karateka.

Wang won third place at the Karate1 Premier League games in Busan in 2012, and took second place at the Karate1 Premier League games in Paris in 2018, and two third places at the events in Rotterdam and Rabat. He has competed several times at the Asian Karate Championships, winning silver at the 2013 Championships in Dubai, bronze at the  2017 Championships in Astana, and silver at the 2018 Championships in Amman.

At the 2018 Asian Games in Jakarta, Wang competed in the Men's kata events, defeating Chris Cheng, Kuok Kin Hang, and Park Heejun to reach the final, but losing to Ryo Kiyuna of Japan, to take the silver medal. At the 2019 World Beach Games in Doha, Wang took silver in the Kata. Wang, then 13th in the World Karate Federation's rankings, defeated a number of higher-ranked favourites to reach the final. He completed at the 2020 Summer Olympics, finishing fifth in his pool during the elimination round.

Achievements

References 

Asian Games medalists in karate
Asian Games silver medalists for Chinese Taipei
Karateka at the 2014 Asian Games
Karateka at the 2018 Asian Games
Living people
Medalists at the 2018 Asian Games
Taiwanese male karateka
Karateka at the 2020 Summer Olympics
1991 births
21st-century Taiwanese people